Birdy and the Beast is a 1944 Warner Bros. Merrie Melodies directed by Bob Clampett. The short was released on August 19, 1944, and stars Tweety.

Plot
Tweety is sitting in his nest, when a cat watches him. Tweety flies off and the cat chases after him. But, the cat doesn't have the ability to fly, so instead he falls to the ground, while Tweety was lying down on a cloud.  The bird then says, "Oh, the poor titty-tat (kitty-cat).  He falled down and go... BOOM!!" (on the word BOOM!, Tweety yells at the top of his lungs) and smiles, then he jumps down and lands on the cat.

The cat attempts to chase Tweety, but Tweety scurries away. Tweety decides to fool the cat by hiding in the bulldog's dish-bowl. The cat comes in and starts looking the bulldog's dish. The bulldog makes his appearance and growls at the cat, but the feline smacks the dog with the bowl.  The chase between the dog and cat ensues (with Tweety following the bulldog) until the leash attached to the dog's collar yanked him to the ground, with his face scrunched in.  The bulldog says to the audience, "This shouldn't even happen to a dog" and then loosens the collar off his face.

Tweety decides to wander and ends up into the cat's mouth, while he is looking for the bird. Tweety decides to set the cat's mouth on fire by holding a match on it. As the cat reactively jumps up from the fire and hits his head on top an open fence railing, Tweety decides to help the cat by using a hose and putting the fire. However, when he fires the hose (by now wearing a firefighter's hat) it turns out that it happens to be connected to a gas (petrol) can, and gasoline goes into the cat's mouth, causing him to explode.  Tweety then says, "Oh, the poor putty tat got hot as a firecracker."  (With a suspenseful drum roll.) "He blew up and go... boom."

The cat manages to survive, but he's still out to get Tweety. When he arrives at the bottom of the tree, he becomes a nest. Tweety attempts to get into it, but a hen, laying her eggs, causes him to get off. When she's finished, she flies off. The cat also arrives and his mouth is full of nothing but eggs. He attempts to catch Tweety once again but fails, then Tweety fakes his screaming and sets a hand grenade with its pin pulled next to him. Thinking it was the bird itself, the cat grabs the grenade. The real Tweety says, "He got it and he can have it."  The cat blows up and Tweety then confesses, "You know, I get rid of more putty tats that way!", then drew a line on the tree of how many cats he got rid of.

Home media
Birdy and the Beast is available uncut and digitally remastered on Looney Tunes Platinum Collection Volume 2 DVD and Blu-Ray set.

See also
 Looney Tunes and Merrie Melodies filmography (1940–1949)
 Tweety
 Bob Clampett

References

External links
 

1944 short films
1944 animated films
Merrie Melodies short films
1940s English-language films
Animated films about cats
Films directed by Bob Clampett
Films scored by Carl Stalling
Warner Bros. Cartoons animated short films
1940s Warner Bros. animated short films
Tweety films
American animated short films
Animated films about birds